Shlesinger is a surname derived from Schlesien, the German name for Silesia.

Notable people with this surname include:
 Bernard Shlesinger (born 1960), American bishop
 Iliza Shlesinger (born 1983), American comedian
 Michael F. Shlesinger (born 1948), American physicist
 Miriam Shlesinger (1947–2012), US-Israeli linguist

See also
 Schlesinger
 Schlessinger
 Slesinger